Allauad's catfish (Clarias alluaudi) is a species of fish in the family Clariidae, the airbreathing catfishes. It is native to the lakes and rivers of East Africa.

This fish reaches 35 centimeters in length. It is often found in swampy waters amongst water lilies and papyrus, where it feeds on insects and crustaceans.

References

Clarias
Freshwater fish of Africa
Taxa named by George Albert Boulenger
Fish described in 1906
Taxonomy articles created by Polbot